Milky Way is a 2000 Bosnian film directed by Faruk Sokolović.

Cast
 Žan Marolt - Mujo Hrle
 Gordana Boban - Sena
 Dragan Bjelogrlić - Ale
 Selma Alispahić - Anka
 Davor Janjić - Josip
 Nada Đurevska - Fata
 Ante Vican - Stjepan
 Ada Sokolović - Dalila
 Hana Sokolović - Denis
 Ivo Gregurević - Službenik
 Nebojša Veljović - Prodavac

References

External links
 

2000 films
Bosnia and Herzegovina war drama films
Bosnian-language films